Area code 473 is the local telephone area code of Grenada, Carriacou and Petite Martinique.  The 473 area code, which spells GRE, was created during a split from the original 809 area code which began permissive dialing on 31 October 1997 and ended 31 October 1998.

For calls placed within Grenada, Carriacou or Petite Martinique, only the seven-digit local number is dialed. Calls to Grenada from anywhere in the United States or Canada are dialed 1 + 473 + seven-digit phone number.

Use in telephone fraud
The 473 area code has been linked to a form of telephone fraud known as the "one ring scam". The person perpetrating the scam calls the victim via a robodialer or similar means, sometimes at odd hours of the night, then hangs up when the phone is answered with the hope that the victim will be curious enough to call the number back. When the victim does this, an automatic $19.95 international call fee is charged to their account, as well as $9.00/min thereafter. Similar scams have been linked to Antigua (area code 268), Jamaica (area codes 876 and 658), the Dominican Republic (area code 809) and the British Virgin Islands (area code 284).

See also

List of NANP area codes
North American Numbering Plan
Area codes in the Caribbean

References

External links
 North American Numbering Plan Administrator
 List of exchanges from AreaCodeDownload.com, 473 Area Code

473
Communications in Grenada